Sir John Michael Leal Uren  (1 September 1923 – 9 August 2019) was a British businessman. He served as the chairman of Civil & Marine from 1955 to 2006. He donated GBP £40 million to his alma mater, Imperial College London, becoming the most generous benefactor in the College’s history.

Early life
Michael Uren was born on 1 September 1923. He was educated at Sherborne School  and Imperial College London, from which he graduated in 1943 with a BSc in Mechanical Engineering and Motive Power.

Career
Uren founded Civil & Marine, a manufacturer of ground granulated blast-furnace slag, in 1955. In the 80’s his company developed the technology that allowed them to make high-quality cement from blast-furnace slag, a waste product of the steel industry. Uren and his business partner John Hobbins turned this invention into a profitable business.

He served as its Chairman until he sold it for GBP£245 million in 2006 to the Hanson Group.

As of 2015, he was worth an estimated GBP£170 million.

Philanthropy

Uren served as the chairman of the Royal London Society for the Blind.

Uren donated GBP £30 million to the King Edward VII's Hospital Sister Agnes in 2013. In 2014, he also donated GBP£40 million to his alma mater, Imperial College London, to fund the creation of the College's new "Bio-Medical Engineering Research Centre" in White City, London, which he envisioned as becoming a cornerstone for "a new Silicon Valley" of biotechnology.

Honours
Uren was appointed Officer of the Order of the British Empire (OBE) in 1999 and was knighted in the 2016 New Year Honours for philanthropic services.

Death
He died on 9 August 2019 at the age of 95.

References

1923 births
2019 deaths
English company founders
English philanthropists
20th-century English businesspeople
21st-century English businesspeople
People educated at Sherborne School
Alumni of Imperial College London
Officers of the Order of the British Empire
Businesspeople awarded knighthoods
Knights Bachelor
20th-century British philanthropists